A serous tumour is a neoplasm that typically has papillary to solid formations of tumor cells with crowded nuclei, and which typically arises on the modified Mullerian-derived serous membranes that surround the ovaries in females. Such ovarian tumors are part of the surface epithelial-stromal tumour group of ovarian tumors. They are common neoplasms with a strong tendency to occur bilaterally, and they account for approximately a quarter of all ovarian tumors. 

Rarely, serous tumors arise from within the uterus, notably uterine serous carcinoma, which typically arises in postmenopausal women. Rarely, serous tumors arise from other parts of the peritoneum, including serous primary peritoneal carcinomas. Even more rarely they arise in other body locations, such as the lungs.

Ovarian serous tumours

Low grade 

The "low grade" classification of serous tumors includes benign and borderline tumors, as well as low grade malignant tumors. Benign serous tumors are distinguished from borderline tumors by the absence of cellular stratification. Stromal invasion distinguishes borderline tumors from low grade malignant tumors. Surgery is curative for benign tumors, and likely curative for other low grade tumors.

Benign serous tumors include serous cystadenomas, cystadenofibromas, and adenofibromas. Benign and borderline serous tumours are commonly unilocular. Benign tumors contain clear fluid and have a smooth lining composed of columnar epithelial cells with cilia. On gross examination, the serous tumor may present as either a cystic lesion in which the papillary epithelium is contained within a few fibrous walled cysts, or the papillary projections may be away from the surface epithelium.

In borderline lesions, the cyst or surface is lined by papillary structures, which are often very complex. Microscopically, stromal papillae are covered by atypical epithelial cells, but stromal invasion is absent, and nuclear stratification is present. 
Approximately 15% of serous tumors are borderline.

In borderline tumors and low grade carcinomas, psammoma bodies are often found. Serous psammocarcinoma is a low grade variant in which massive psammoma bodies are present.

High grade 

High grade serous tumors often involve both ovaries. The tumors are solid and cystic with haemorrhage and necrosis. They are morphologically heterogenous. Serous carcinomas often have bulky peritoneal and omental metastases, and spread to the lymph nodes is frequent.

Unsurprisingly, 5-year survival decreases as the stage increases.
There is a 25% survival rate with a stage III serous carcinoma.
Staging:
 Stage I - Tumour growth limited to ovaries.
 Stage II - Growth involving one or both ovaries with pelvic extension.
 Stage III - Tumour involving one or both ovaries with implants outside pelvis.
 Stage IV- Tumour involving one or both ovaries with presence of distant metastasis.

Epidemiology 
25% of ovarian tumors and 40% of ovarian cancers are serous tumors. Family history and nulliparity have been identified as risk factors for the disease.

Uterine serous carcinoma

Uterine serous carcinoma is an uncommon form of endometrial cancer that typically arises in postmenopausal women.
It is typically diagnosed on endometrial biopsy, prompted by post-menopausal bleeding. Unlike the more common low-grade endometrioid endometrial adenocarcinoma, uterine serous carcinoma does not develop from endometrial hyperplasia and is not hormone-sensitive. It arises in the setting of endometrial atrophy and is classified as a type II endometrial cancer.

References

External links 

Gynaecological cancer